Federal Gazette may refer to:
 Bundesgesetzblatt (disambiguation), Federal Law Gazette, Germany and Austria
 Federal Gazette (Switzerland) / Bundesblatt / Feuille fédérale / Foglio federale of Switzerland
Initial name of the Philadelphia Gazette
Pennsylvania Federal Gazette
Federal Gazette (Baltimore)
Official Federal Gazette, Brazil